Septa hepatica is a species of predatory sea snail, a marine gastropod mollusk in the family Cymatiidae.

Distribution
This marine species occurs in the Indian Ocean off the Mascarene Basin; also off Papua New Guinea.

References

 Beu, A. (2010). Catalogue of Tonnoidea

External links
 Röding, P.F. (1798). Museum Boltenianum sive Catalogus cimeliorum e tribus regnis naturæ quæ olim collegerat Joa. Fried Bolten, M. D. p. d. per XL. annos proto physicus Hamburgensis. Pars secunda continens Conchylia sive Testacea univalvia, bivalvia & multivalvia. Trapp, Hamburg. viii, 199 pp

Cymatiidae
Gastropods described in 1798